Cypress Methodist Camp Ground is a historic Methodist camp meeting in Ridgeville, Dorchester County, South Carolina. Cypress Camp Ground was functional as early as 1794, and an adjacent cemetery contains graves from the early 1800s. The campground is in the general shape of a rectangle of 34 tents, or cabins, made of rough-hewn lumber. These cabins, rectangular shaped, are generally 1 1/2-stories and contain earthen floors.

It was added to the National Register of Historic Places in 1978.

See also 
 Camp Welfare: AME Zion camp meeting ground in Fairfield County, South Carolina
 Cattle Creek Campground: United Methodist camp meeting ground in Orangeburg County, South Carolina
 Indian Fields Campground: Methodist camp meeting ground in Dorchester County, South Carolina
 Mount Carmel Campground: AME Zion camp meeting ground in Lancaster County, South Carolina
 St. Paul Camp Ground: AME camp meeting ground in Dorchester County, South Carolina

References

Methodism in South Carolina
Properties of religious function on the National Register of Historic Places in South Carolina
National Register of Historic Places in Dorchester County, South Carolina
Camp meeting grounds
Campgrounds in South Carolina
1794 establishments in South Carolina